Elections to the Labour Party's Shadow Cabinet (more formally, its "Parliamentary Committee") occurred in November 1961. In addition to the 12 members elected, the Leader (Hugh Gaitskell), Deputy Leader (George Brown), Labour Chief Whip (Herbert Bowden), Labour Leader in the House of Lords (A. V. Alexander), and Labour Chief Whip in the House of Lords (the Earl of Lucan)  were automatically members.  The election saw no changes to the Shadow Cabinet.

References

1961
Labour Party Shadow Cabinet election
Labour Party Shadow Cabinet election